Gevorg Badalyan (born 5 January 1991) is an Armenian professional footballer, who currently plays as a striker for FC Hlučín of the MSFL in Czech Republic.

References

 
 UEFA profile
 Profile at http://www.sandecja.com.pl/

1991 births
Living people
Footballers from Yerevan
Armenian footballers
Armenia youth international footballers
Armenian expatriate footballers
FK Baník Most players
FC Baník Ostrava players
Sandecja Nowy Sącz players
Partizán Bardejov players
2. Liga (Slovakia) players
Expatriate footballers in the Czech Republic
Czech First League players
Expatriate footballers in Poland
Expatriate footballers in Slovakia
Armenian expatriate sportspeople in the Czech Republic
Armenian expatriate sportspeople in Slovakia
Armenian expatriate sportspeople in Poland
Association football forwards